Cacia subfasciata is a species of beetle in the family Cerambycidae. It was described by Schwarzer in 1930. It is known from Sumatra and Java.

References

Cacia (beetle)
Beetles described in 1930